Ramanayake is a Sinhalese surname. Notable people with the surname include:

Vijaya Ramanayake (1945–2016), Sri Lankan film producer, music producer, songwriter, journalist, author and the founder of Tharanga Music and Film
Champaka Ramanayake (born 1965), Sri Lankan cricketer
Ranjan Ramanayake (born 1963), Sri Lankan film actor, film director, singer and a writer and also a politician

Sinhalese surnames